The 2008 Chinese Super League (known as the Kingway 2008 Chinese Super League for sponsorship reasons) was the 5th season since the establishment of the Chinese Super League and the 15th season of the professional football league in China. Super League was expanded to 16 clubs. Shandong Luneng Taishan won their 3rd title at the end of this season.

Promotion and Relegation
 At the end of the 2007 season, Guangzhou GPC and Chengdu Blades were promoted to Super League.
 At the end of the 2007 season, Xiamen were relegated.
 Wuhan Guanggu withdrew from the league and folded.
 At the end of the season, Liaoning Whowin were relegated.

Final league table

Results table

Top scorers

Stadia and Attendance

Managers

See also
Chinese Jia League 2008
Chinese Yi League 2008

References

External links
 Official site of the Chinese Super League 
 Live scores, Fixtures and Results, League table on FIFA 
 Results and table on RSSSF

Chinese Super League seasons
1
China
China